Syracuse was an ancient Greek city-state, located on the east coast of Sicily. The city was founded by settlers from Corinth in 734 or 733 BCE, and was conquered by the Romans in 212 BCE, after which it became the seat of Roman rule in Sicily. Throughout much of its history as an independent city, it was governed by a succession of tyrants, with only short periods of democracy and oligarchy. While Pindar addressed the Deinomenids as kings (basileus) in his odes, it is not clear that this (or any other title) was officially used by any of the tyrants until Agathocles adopted the title in 304.

Tyrants of Syracuse

Deinomenids (485–465)
Gelon I (485 BCE–478 BCE)
Hiero I (478 BCE–466 BCE)
Thrasybulus (466 BCE–465 BCE)

Thrasybulus was deposed in 465 and Syracuse had a republican government for the next sixty years. This period is usually known as the Second Democracy (465-405). The extent to which Syracuse was a democracy in the same sense as Athens during this period is debated.

Dionysii (405–344)
Dionysius the Elder (405 BCE–367 BCE)
Dionysius the Younger (367 BCE–356 BCE)
Dion (357 BCE–355 BCE)
Calippus (355 BCE–353 BCE)
 (353 BCE–c.350 BCE)
 (c.350 BCE–346 BCE)
Dionysius the Younger (restored, 346 BCE–344 BCE)

Timoleon (345–337)
Timoleon (345 BCE–337 BCE)

Timoleon revived a republican form of government in Syracuse, which continued after his death. This period is usually known as the Third Democracy (337-317). The name is misleading; for at least some of the period Syracuse was run as an oligarchy.

Agathocles (317–289)
Agathocles (317 BCE–289 BCE)
Numismatic evidence suggests that republican government may have existed for a few years between the death of Agathokles and Hicetas' assumption of power; this is sometimes referred to as the Fourth Democracy (289-287?). Nothing is known about it.

Interregnum (289–276)
Hicetas (289 BCE–280 BCE)
 &  (279 BC–277 BCE)
Pyrrhus of Epirus (278–276 BCE)

Hieronids (275–214)
Hiero II (275 BCE–215 BCE)
Gelo II (until 216 BCE)
Hieronymus (215 BCE–214 BCE)

In the aftermath of the devastating Roman defeat at the Battle of Cannae, Hieronymus entered into an alliance with Hannibal, which would ultimately decide the city's fate politically. As a result of Syracuse's support for Carthage, the Romans under Marcus Claudius Marcellus began besieging the city in 214 BC. Hieronymus was assassinated shortly thereafter and a republican government restored (the Fifth Democracy) but the city fell to the Romans in 212 BCE.

References

Tyrants

Ancient Syracuse
Gela